Annie Liljeberg (born 22 August 1957) is a Swedish diver. She competed in the women's 3 metre springboard event at the 1980 Summer Olympics.

References

External links
 

1957 births
Living people
Swedish female divers
Olympic divers of Sweden
Divers at the 1980 Summer Olympics
Divers from Stockholm